Stoney Woodson (born October 11, 1985) is a former American football cornerback. He was drafted by the New York Giants in the seventh round in the 2009 NFL Draft. He played college football at South Carolina.

Woodson was also a member of the Philadelphia Eagles and Tampa Bay Buccaneers.

He attended George S. Middleton High School in Tampa, FL, and played for the Middleton High School Tigers high school football team.

Professional career

New York Giants
Woodson was drafted by the New York Giants in the seventh round of the 2009 NFL Draft. He suffered an ankle injury prior to the start of the 2009 season and was placed on injured reserve. The Giants gave him an injury settlement on September 6, 2009.

Philadelphia Eagles
Woodson was signed to the Philadelphia Eagles practice squad on October 13, 2009. He was released from the practice squad on October 22. He was re-signed to the practice squad on November 11 after cornerback Jack Ikegwuonu was promoted to the active roster. He was released on December 8.

Tampa Bay Buccaneers
Woodson was signed to the Tampa Bay Buccaneers' practice squad on December 9, 2009. On January 5, 2010, he signed a reserve future contract.

He was waived on April 26, 2010.

Tri-Cities Fever
Woodson signed with the Tri-Cities Fever, of the Indoor Football League, for the 2012 season. He was later let out of his contract to pursue a higher level.

Jacksonville Sharks
Woodson with the Jacksonville Sharks of the Arena Football League on September 29, 2011. He was released by the Sharks on March 7, 2012.

References

External links
Tampa Bay Buccaneers bio
Philadelphia Eagles bio
South Carolina Gamecocks bio

1985 births
Living people
Players of American football from Florida
American football cornerbacks
South Carolina Gamecocks football players
New York Giants players
Philadelphia Eagles players
Tampa Bay Buccaneers players
Jacksonville Sharks players